How Europe Underdeveloped Africa is a 1972 book written by Walter Rodney that describes how Africa was deliberately exploited and underdeveloped by European colonial regimes. One of his main arguments throughout the book is that Africa developed Europe at the same rate that Europe underdeveloped Africa.

Rodney argues that a combination of power politics and economic exploitation of Africa by Europeans led to the poor state of African political and economic development evident in the late 20th century. Though, he did not intend "to remove the ultimate responsibility for development from the shoulders of Africans... [He believes that] every African has a responsibility to understand the [capitalist] system and work for its overthrow."

This book, along with Frantz Fanon's The Wretched of the Earth, is a popular example of 20th century books concerning African development and post-colonial theory.

Background 
First published in London by Bogle-L'Ouverture Publications in 1972 (in partnership with Tanzanian Publishing House), the book shaped the study of Africa in many disciplines. Rodney wrote the text during his time in Dar es Salaam, during the presidency of Julius Nyerere. Tanzanian scholar Karim F Hirji has described the work as, "no doubt the 20th century's most important and influential book on African history."

Synopsis 
Rodney argues that to fully appreciate and understand the effect of European exploitation on Africa, four distinct issues need to be addressed: a reconstruction of pre-European Africa’s developmental condition, that of pre-expansionist Europe, and their contributions to each other’s present condition, developed or otherwise. After an introductory chapter in which he definitionally discusses development, underdevelopment, and associated terminologies in their historical and contemporary contexts, he devotes a chapter to each of these four issues. He concludes the book with a chapter critiquing arguments that promote the "supposed benefit of colonialism". In this chapter, he also explicates on the means through which colonialism is linked to Africa's present underdevelopment.

Editions

 (1972) London: Bogle-L'Ouverture Publications
 (1974) Washington, DC: Howard University Press
 (1981) Howard University Press
 (1982) Howard University Press
 (2018) Verso Books

References 

1972 non-fiction books
Books about Africa
History books about Europe
History books about Africa
Imperialism studies
20th-century history books
Walter Rodney